Van Buren High School is a comprehensive public high school serving students in grades 10 through 12 in Van Buren, Arkansas, United States. It is the sole high school administered by the Van Buren School District.

History 
The school underwent a major development project that was finished in 2009. The project added a number of new classrooms, a new basketball facility (Clair Bates Arena), and a 1,500 seat concert and performing arts center, known as the Van Buren Fine Arts Center.

Curriculum 
The assumed course of study at Van Buren High School exceeds the Smart Core curriculum developed by the Arkansas Department of Education (ADE). Students engage in regular and Advanced Placement (AP) coursework and exams to obtain at least 24 units beyond the 22 units required by the Smart Core curriculum. The Van Buren School District offers students a Smart Core diploma, a College Prep diploma, a College Prep with Honors diploma, and a College Prep with High Honors diploma, each based on certain coursework and grade point average requirements. Exceptional students have been recognized as National Merit Finalists and participated in Arkansas Governor's School.

The school maintains a concurrent credit partnership with the University of Arkansas – Fort Smith, Arkansas Tech University, Western Arkansas Technical Center, and Northwest Arkansas Community College, whereas students may receive concurrent high school and college credit.

The Pointer Pride Marching Band has won several marching contests, including Broken Arrow Invitational Grand Champions in 2010.

Athletics 
The school's mascot is the Pointer (hunting dog), and its school colors are kelly green and white.

For 2012-17, the Van Buren Pointers compete in the state's largest classification (7A) And in 2018 will compete in the state's second-largest classification  (6A) within the 7A/6A Central Conference of the Arkansas Activities Association (AAA).  The Pointers engage in numerous interscholastic activities, including baseball, basketball (boys/girls), cross country (boys/girls), football, golf, track, soccer, softball, tennis (boys/girls), and volleyball, along with marching band, cheer, and dance.  Other extracurricular activities include a journalism department that produces the student newspaper and yearbook, choir, and drama.

The Van Buren High School Pointers have won several state and conference championships in multiple sports:
 Football State Champions (4x): 1912, 1930, 1977, 1996
 Bowling State Champions (2x): 2010, 2020
 Girls Cross Country State Champions (1x): 2010
 Boys Basketball State Champions (1x): 1950
 Girls Basketball State Champions (5x): 1950, 1951, 1953, 1954, 1955
 Boys Golf State Champions (2x): 1970, 1976
 Competitive Cheer State Champions (2x AAA): 2006, 2007, 2008 (girls), 2018
 Competitive Dance State Champions (1x): 2008
 Boys Soccer State Champions (2x): 2006, 2021
 Marching Band State Champions (4x): 2017, 2018, 2020, 2021
 Baseball State Champions (1x): 2021

Alumni
 Juanita Broaddrick (then Smith), 1960
 Shay Mooney, 2011

See also

List of high schools in Arkansas

References

External links
 
Van Buren School District website

Public high schools in Arkansas
Schools in Crawford County, Arkansas
Buildings and structures in Van Buren, Arkansas